HMS Scotia is one of the newest Royal Naval Reserve units, formed in 1958, and currently recruiting from the east of Scotland. The unit inhabits spacious, modern accommodation with excellent facilities, headquartered in Rosyth Naval Dockyard. The unit has excellent communication links by road, rails and air.

History
The unit, despite being relatively new, has tradition rooted in the very cradle of Volunteer Reserve activity in Scotland. In August 1903 the Admiralty appointed the first two Commanding Officers of the then RNVR to form divisions in London and on the Clyde. 

Lieutenant Commander (later Commodore) The Duke of Montrose raised the Clyde Division based in Glasgow, and the division rapidly expanded across Scotland, first to Dundee onboard the sailing frigate, HMS Unicorn, and then to Edinburgh, onboard the monitor, renamed HMS Claverhouse. These two East Coast divisions were, many years later, to form the heart of the modern HMS Scotia.

Under the 1994 defence review all three of these original Scottish Sea Training Centres, Glasgow, Edinburgh and Dundee, were combined into two units of a different type, HMS Scotia in Fife and HMS Dalriada in Greenock. Both of these had been units formed in the cold war to support nearby naval headquarters, and both were rapidly expanded to accommodate the closing units. In the case of Scotia, this required a complete rebuild.

Timeline
1958 - HQ Unit formed at MHQ (Marine Headquarters) Pitreavie
1960 - Name of HMS Scotia adopted. The previous ship of that name was a wartime shore training establishment in Ayr (currently a Butlins holiday camp).
1962 - Crest of HMS Scotia matriculated on 5 Sep 1962 by Lord Lyon, King of Arms, in the Public Register of Arms and Bearings in Scotland.
1962 - HMS Scotia moved out of MHQ into accommodation above ground at Pitreavie.
1994 - HMS Scotia absorbed 267 reservists from HMS Camperdown and Claverhouse to become the largest RNR establishment in the UK with 375 personnel. Re-designated a Reserve Training centre on 1 Oct 1994.
1996 - Moved to a new site within Royal Naval Support Establishment HMS Caledonia on 15 May 1996. Official rededication ceremony conducted on 12 Oct 1996 in the presence of Prince Michael of Kent as Honorary Commodore RNR.
1999 - Tay Division of HMS Scotia set up in Dundee.
2000 - Forth Division of HMS Scotia set up in Edinburgh.
2004 - Forth Division closes

Tay and Forth Divisions
An important 'first' has been the establishment of Scotias Satellites. Although Scotia is a large and vigorous unit, it was recognised that its distance from the city centres of Edinburgh and Dundee was inhibiting recruitment at a time when the Royal Navy's demand for reservists was growing. 

Scotia became the testbed for a scheme to extend the RNR footprint with the first satellite unit, the Tay Division of HMS Scotia in Dundee, which started training in 1999 and rapidly established itself as the national benchmark. It was soon followed by another Scotia satellite, Forth Division, in Edinburgh.  

It was as a direct result of these efforts in expansion that Scotia was awarded the "Director's Trophy" in 2001.

Forth Division in Edinburgh closed in 2004.

References

External links
HMS Scotia on the Royal Navy website

 

Royal Navy bases in Scotland